Drusilla is a given name derived from the ancient Roman cognomen Drusilla, other uses are;
 Drusilla (beetle), a genus of beetles
 Drusilla (Buffy the Vampire Slayer), character from Buffy the Vampire Slayer
 Drusilla (Wonder Girl), incarnation of the DC Comics character Wonder Girl
 , a United States Navy patrol vessel in commission from 1917 to 1918
 "Drusilla", a 1935 story by William Faulkner, later merged into The Unvanquished

See also
 Julia Drusilla (disambiguation)